Unión Deportiva San Claudio is a Spanish football club based in the parish of San Claudio, Oviedo, Asturias. Founded in 1967, it currently plays in Tercera División.

History
On 30 April 2018, San Claudio promoted to Tercera División for the first time ever.

Season to season

Basketball section
Between 2008 and 2013, San Claudio had a basketball team that played in the Asturian group of the Primera División, Spanish fifth tier. In 2010 and 2012, they played the league Final Four, being defeated in both times in the semifinals.

References

External links

Football clubs in Asturias
Association football clubs established in 1967
1967 establishments in Spain
Basketball teams established in 2008
Basketball teams disestablished in 2013
Defunct basketball teams in Spain
Basketball teams in Asturias